The Deathday Party is a 2014 Chinese suspense thriller film directed by Xie Hang. It was released on September 19, 2014.

Cast
Anita Yuen
Archie Kao
Xiong Naijin
Zhang Zimu

Reception
By September 28, it had earned ¥4.72 million at the Chinese box office.

References

2014 films
2010s thriller films
China Film Group Corporation films
Chinese thriller films
Chinese suspense films